The Newmarracarra Limestone is a Bajocian geologic formation, in Western Australia. It consists of yellow grey sandy or clayey limestone, which occasionally grades into calcareous sandstone. Fossils of the Rhynchonellida in the family Wellerellidae, Cirpa fromontae were reported from the formation.

References

Bibliography 
 R. S. Craig. 2002. A new Jurassic Rhynchonellide Brachiopod from the Newmarracarra Limestone, Perth Basin, Western Australia. Records of the Western Australian Museum (20)387-392

Geologic formations of Australia
Jurassic System of Australia
Bajocian Stage
Limestone formations
Shallow marine deposits
Geology of Western Australia